José Luis Laguía Martínez (born 30 September 1959) is a retired Spanish road cyclist and climber. He won a record five mountains classifications at the Vuelta a España during his career. As a faithful Domestique of Pedro Delgado he followed his leader to  when he left .

Major results
Sources:

1980 
 2nd Overall Vuelta a los Valles Mineros
1st Stage 3b (ITT)
 2nd Klasika Primavera
 2nd Clásica de Sabiñánigo
 5th Overall Tour of the Basque Country
 8th Overall Volta a la Comunitat Valenciana
1981 
 1st Stage 3 Vuelta a Asturias
 4th Overall Tour of the Basque Country
 4th Overall Vuelta a Burgos
 5th Road race, National Road Championships
 7th Overall Vuelta a España
1st  Mountains classification 
 7th Overall Setmana Catalana de Ciclisme
 8th Overall Volta a la Comunitat Valenciana
1982 
 1st  Road race, National Road Championships
 1st  Overall Tour of the Basque Country
 1st  Overall Vuelta a Burgos
 Volta a Catalunya
1st Stages 1 & 2b 
 1st Stage 2 Costa del Azahar
 5th Overall Vuelta a España
1st  Mountains classification
1st Stages 6, 9 & 11
 5th Overall Setmana Catalana de Ciclisme
 5th Klasika Primavera
1983
 1st  Overall Vuelta a Cantabria
1st Stage 1
 1st Clásica a los Puertos de Guadarrama
 Vuelta a España
1st  Mountains classification
1st Stage 16
 Vuelta a Burgos
1st  Mountains classification
1st Stage 5 
 1st Stage 2 Vuelta a Aragón
 2nd GP Navarra
 4th Road race, National Road Championships
 4th Klasika Primavera
 6th Overall Setmana Catalana de Ciclisme
 8th Overall Volta a Catalunya
1984 
 1st Stage 2 Grand Prix du Midi Libre
 1st Stage 5a Vuelta a los Valles Mineros
 2nd Overall Escalada a Montjuïc
1st Stage 1b (ITT)
 5th Trofeo Masferrer
 8th Overall Setmana Catalana de Ciclisme
1985 
 1st  Mountains classification Vuelta a España
 2nd Clásica de Sabiñánigo
 3rd Gran Premio de Llodio
 5th Subida a Arrate
 6th Trofeo Masferrer
 7th Overall Tour of the Basque Country
1st Stage 1 
1986 
 1st  Overall Vuelta Ciclista a la Rioja
 1st  Mountains classification Vuelta a España
 3rd Trofeo Masferrer
 7th Overall Grand Prix du Midi Libre
 9th Klasika Primavera
1987 
 6th Overall Tour of the Basque Country
1988 
 1st Stage 1 Vuelta a Castilla y León
1989 
 9th Overall Tour of the Basque Country
 10th Trofeo Masferrer
1990 
 8th Overall Vuelta a Aragón
1991 
 4th Overall Tour of the Basque Country
 5th Klasika Primavera
 6th Overall Euskal Bizikleta

Grand Tour general classification results timeline

References

External links

GBR Athletics
Arcotriunfal (in Spanish)

1959 births
Living people
Spanish male cyclists
Spanish Vuelta a España stage winners
Sportspeople from the Province of Ciudad Real
Cyclists from Castilla-La Mancha